Thlypopsis is a genus of birds in the tanager family Thraupidae.

Taxonomy and species list
The genus Thlypopsis was introduced by the German ornithologists Jean Cabanis in 1851. The name combines the Ancient Greek thlupis, a word for an unknown small bird, and opsis meaning "appearance". The type species was subsequently designated as the orange-headed tanager (Thlypopsis sordida).

The chestnut-headed tanager was formerly placed in the genus Pyrrhocoma and the superciliaried hemispingus in Hemispingus. A molecular phylogenetic study published in 2014 found that these two species were embedded in Thlypopsis.

The genus contains eight species:

References

 
Bird genera